Kolajan-e Qajar (also Romanized as Kolājān-e Qājār) is a village in Roshanabad Rural District, in the Central District of Gorgan County, Golestan Province, Iran. At the 2006 census, its population was 717, in 200 families.

References 

Populated places in Gorgan County